Sarah Taylor is a VJ for MuchMusic in Canada.

Early life 
Taylor is from Hamilton, Ontario, Canada. She studied English and Women's Studies at McMaster University.

Career 
She was discovered in the audience for the MuchMusic show MuchOnDemand in 2004, and was asked to be one of the VJs for the channel.

Taylor co-hosts many of MuchMusic's popular shows, including Combat Zone, and MuchTakeOver.

It was announced on February 16, 2007 on MuchMusic's website that Taylor underwent emergency surgery at a hospital in Las Vegas, Nevada on Thursday, February 15, 2007 to "relieve pressure on her brain". Tests revealed that the pressure was caused by her skull being fractured, which was caused by an accidental fall.

In 2009, Taylor was featured on the cover of Canadian Teen Girl Magazine's Technology Issue. It was also broadcast on Fashion Television.

References

External links
MuchMusic profile: Sarah Taylor
Sarah Taylor

People from Hamilton, Ontario
Much (TV channel) personalities
Year of birth missing (living people)
Living people
McMaster University alumni
Canadian VJs (media personalities)
Canadian women television personalities